Make Money is a studio album released in 1996 by the Washington, D.C.-based go-go band E.U.

Track listing

Personnel
 Gregory "Sugar Bear" Elliott – vocals, bass guitar
 Ivan Goff – backing vocals, keyboards
 Maurice C. Hagans – congas
 A.K. Webster – electric guitar
 David B. Gussam – electric guitar
 Kent Wood – keyboards
 Nathaniel Lucas – percussion

References

1996 albums
Experience Unlimited albums